Resana is a comune (municipality) in the Province of Treviso in the Italian region Veneto, located about  northwest of Venice and about  west of Treviso.

The municipality of Resana contains the frazioni (subdivisions, mainly villages and hamlets) Castelminio and San Marco. Castelminio used to be known as Brusaporco.

Resana borders the following municipalities: Castelfranco Veneto, Loreggia, Piombino Dese, Vedelago.

Demographic evolution

Twin towns
Resana is twinned with:

  Montville, Seine-Maritime, France, since 2008
Hamilton, Ontario, Canada

References

External links
 www.comune.resana.tv.it/

Cities and towns in Veneto